Chambers Street is a street in Edinburgh, Scotland, in the southern extremity of the Old Town.  The street is named after William Chambers of Glenormiston, the Lord Provost of Edinburgh who was the main proponent of the Edinburgh Improvement Act (1867) which led to its creation in 1870. A narrow lane named North College Street and three residential squares built in the 18th century—Adam Square, Argyle Square and Brown Square—disappeared in the process. The street is dominated by University and museum buildings. It also hosts a variety of restaurants and venues.

Notable buildings
Buildings by date of completion:

 Old College, University of Edinburgh, 1791-1827 (Old College faces onto South Bridge, and predates the construction of Chambers Street; the facade to Chambers Street is noticeably flat for a building designed variously by Robert Adam and William Henry Playfair)
 Minto House, 1878, the site was formerly the home of Lord Dunsinane, now the University of Edinburgh Department of Architecture
 Royal Museum, 1888
 Adam House, University of Edinburgh, 1953 (designed by William Kininmonth)
 Edinburgh Sheriff Court, 1995
 Museum of Scotland, 1998
 Former Edinburgh Dental Hospital and School

References

Streets in Edinburgh
Old Town, Edinburgh